Reiche Ebrach is a river of Bavaria, Germany. It flows into the Regnitz near Hirschaid.

See also
List of rivers of Bavaria

References

Rivers of Bavaria
Erlangen-Höchstadt
Bamberg (district)
Kitzingen (district)
Rivers of Germany